Habib Guèye (born 8 March 1999) is a French professional footballer who plays for FC Bastia-Borgo as a centre-back.

Professional career
Guèye was part of the Bastia youth academy, and joined Niort in 2018. He made his professional debut with Niort in a 1–0 Ligue 2 win over Paris FC on 5 October 2018.

International career
Born in France, Guèye is of Senegalese descent.

References

External links
 
 

1999 births
Living people
People from Meaux
Footballers from Seine-et-Marne
French footballers
French sportspeople of Senegalese descent
Association football defenders
Chamois Niortais F.C. players
FC Bastia-Borgo players
Ligue 2 players
Championnat National 3 players
Championnat National players